Lydman is a surname. Notable people with the surname include:

 Jack Wilson Lydman (1914–2005), American actor and ambassador
 Toni Lydman (born 1977), Finnish ice hockey player

See also
 Lyman (name)